Essex 2 (also known as Essex Spitfire 2 for sponsorship reasons) was an English Rugby Union league at the tenth tier of the domestic competition. It was the basement division of club rugby in Essex with promoted teams moving up to Essex 1 and no relegation (up until 2008-09 relegated teams dropped to Essex 3 but this division has since been abolished). Essex 2 was created in 2003 by Essex-based teams who left East Counties 3 South. At the end of the 2013–14 season the division was abolished with teams either moving up into Essex 1 or into various Essex Merit leagues.

Original teams

When Essex 2 was introduced in 2003 it contained the following teams:

Bancroft - transferred from Eastern Counties 2 South (4th)
Burnham-On-Crouch - transferred from Eastern Counties 2 South (7th)
Dagenham - transferred from Eastern Counties 2 South (8th)
Loughton  - transferred from Eastern Counties 3 South (3rd)
Old Brentwoods - transferred from Eastern Counties 2 South (5th)
Old Edwardians - transferred from Eastern Counties 2 South (10th)
Ravens - transferred from Eastern Counties 3 South (champions)
Runwell Wyverns  - transferred from Eastern Counties 3 South (runners up)
South Woodham Ferrers - transferred from Eastern Counties 2 South (6th)
Thames - transferred from Eastern Counties 2 South - transferred from Eastern Counties 2 South (9th)

Essex 2 honours

Essex 2 (2003–2009)

The original Essex 2 was a tier 9 league with promotion up to Essex 1 and relegation down to Essex 3.

Essex 2 (2009–2014)

Essex 2 remained a tier 10 league despite national restructuring by the RFU.  Promotion was to Essex 1 and there was no relegation since the cancellation of Essex 3 at the end of the 2008–09 season.  Essex 2 was itself disbanded at the end of the 2013–14 season with all teams either promoted to Essex 1 or transferred to the Essex Merit Leagues.

Number of league titles

Millwall (2)
Writtle Wanderers (2)
Canvey Island (1)
Clacton (1)
Dagenham (1)
Epping Upper Clapton (1)
May & Baker (1)
Pegasus Palmerians (1)
Thames (1)

Notes

See also
London & SE Division RFU
Essex RFU
English rugby union system
Rugby union in England

References

E
Rugby union in Essex
Sports leagues established in 2003
Sports leagues disestablished in 2014
2003 establishments in England
2014 disestablishments in England